Scaleber Force (also known as Scaleber Foss and Scaleber Waterfall), is a  high waterfall on Stockdale Beck, later the Long Preston Beck, that feeds into the River Ribble between Settle and Long Preston in North Yorkshire, England. The waterfall is the result of geological faulting (part of the South Craven Fault) and is a popular tourist attraction.

Toponymy
The waterfall is written variously as Scaleber Waterfall, Scaleber Force and Scaleber Foss. Though Foss is an Old Norse word meaning waterfall, from which Force is derived, the two are interchangeable in some sources. However, Ordnance Survey mapping shows it as Scaleber Force. The local pronunciation of Scaleber is Scallyber, though Scale-ber is often heard.

Geology
Scaleber Force lies on the South Craven Fault, and the action of the water has eroded the soft limestone into a deep gorge, exposing limestone boulder beds at the top of the waterfall. The limestone at Scaleber Force is either Late Arundian stage, or the Holkerian stage of the Viséan age limestone.

Description
The waterfall is a popular destination and is accessible by walkers and bike-riders; one ride, known as the Settle Loop, has Scaleber Force as a waypoint. Along with Catrigg Force and various natural caverns, the foot access to the site is marketed locally as the  Settle Caves and Waterfalls Walk. There is a long held belief that Edward Elgar was inspired by the site (and Catrigg Force), as he walked the Ribblesdale countryside often with his friend, Dr Buck, who lived in Settle. The site is popular with photographers and sightseers as water cascades over two sections with a plunge pool at the bottom.

Notes

References

Sources

External links

My Yorkshire Dales entry for Scaleber Force

Waterfalls of North Yorkshire
Ribblesdale
Yorkshire Dales